Trafalgar Park may refer to:
Trafalgar Park, Nelson, a sports venue in Nelson, New Zealand
Trafalgar Park, Wiltshire, a park surrounding Trafalgar House, Wiltshire, England, UK
Trafalgar Park, a neighbourhood of Kingston, Jamaica, near Liguanea
Trafalgar Park, a park in Woodstock, Cape Town, South Africa